World Trade Center Doha is a 51-storey office building on the Doha Corniche in Al Dafna, Qatar. This tower belongs to Qatar World Trade Center. It was begun in 2010 and completed in 2013.

References 

Doha
Skyscrapers in Doha
Skyscraper office buildings
Office buildings completed in 2013